FIC may refer to:

 Federazione Italiana Canottaggio (Italian Rowing Federation)
 Falkland Islands Company
 Fascia iliaca block
 Family Institute of Connecticut
 Family integrated church
 Federation of Irish Cyclists
 Feline idiopathic cystitis
 Fellow of the Royal Institute of Chemistry
 Fellowship for Intentional Community, in the United States
 Fiction
 Fanfiction
 First International Computer a Taiwanese electronics manufacturer
 Flight Information Centre, in Canada
 Focused information criterion
 Fortifications Interpretation Centre, in Malta
 Forum international de la cybersécurité, in France
 Found in collection
 Fox International Channels
 Fraser International College, in Burnaby, British Columbia, Canada
 John E. Fogarty International Center, part of the United States National Institutes of Health
 Fully industrialised country (FIC)